Lego Racers was a Lego product line with the first wave of sets being released in 2001. The range was first introduced in 2001 named after the Lego Racers video game series with the first wave of sets being based on the Xalax segment of Lego Racers 2. The earlier sets were designed more as racing car toys than construction toy, and included a launcher element (which doubled up as a storage container) that could be used to propel the vehicles. Over time the theme developed and became more in line with the style of other Lego products, while still encouraging a racing form of gameplay. The theme also included licensed models of real-life high-speed cars, such as a Lamborghini Gallardo and a Ferrari FXX. The product line was discontinued in 2013 after 12 years. A spiritual successor Lego Speed Champions was released in 2015, with a similar premise.

Construction sets 
According to Bricklink, The Lego Group released 254 playsets as part of the Lego Racers theme. The product line was eventually discontinued by the end of 2013.

Video games

Lego Racers (video game)

Lego Racers is a Lego-themed racing video game developed by High Voltage Software and published by Lego Media.

Lego Racers 2

Lego Racers 2 is a Lego-themed racing video game developed by Attention to Detail, published by Lego Software and distributed in North America by Electronic Arts. It was first released in September 2001 for Microsoft Windows, PlayStation 2 and Game Boy Advance. It is the sequel to the 1999 game Lego Racers. This sequel was first revealed by Lego Software on August 20, 2001.

See also
Lego City
Lego Fusion
Lego Speed Champions - The spiritual successor to Lego Racers.
Lego Speed Racer
Lego World Racers - A Lego theme with a racing premise.
Lego Cars

References

External links
Official website
Brickset

Racers
Products introduced in 1975

fr:Lego Racers
it:LEGO Racers
hu:Lego Racers
pl:Lego Racers
pt:LEGO Racers (jogo eletrônico)
fi:Lego Racers